Baron Ashton may refer to 

 James Williamson, 1st Baron Ashton (1842–1930) 
 Baron Ashton of Hyde
Thomas Gair Ashton, 1st Baron Ashton of Hyde (1855–1933)
Thomas Henry Raymond Ashton, 2nd Baron Ashton of Hyde (1901–1983)
Thomas John Ashton, 3rd Baron Ashton of Hyde (1926–2008)
Thomas Henry Ashton, 4th Baron Ashton of Hyde (born 1958)

See also  
 Catherine Margaret Ashton, Baroness Ashton of Upholland (born 1956)
 Baron Ashtown
 Ashton (disambiguation)